Tumen, or tümen ("unit of ten thousand";
A tumen denotes a tribal unit of 10,000 households, or a military unit of 10,000 soldiers.

Magyar military organization of the Conquest Era
It was thought that the same kind of military organization was used by the Magyars during the conquest of Hungary. According to Ahmad ibn Rustah (c. 930), a Persian explorer and geographer relying on second-hand information, the "Magyars are a race of Turks and their king rides out with horsemen to the number of 10,000 and this king is called Kanda".

Genghis Khan's organization
In Genghis Khan's military system, a tumen was recursively built from units of 10 (aravt), 100 (zuut) and 1,000 (mingghan), each with a leader reporting to the next higher level. Tumens were considered a practical size, neither too small for an effective campaign nor too big for efficient transport and supply. The military strategy was based on the use of tumens as a useful building block causing reasonable shock and attack. A Mongol army usually consisted out of three tumen, but armies consisting of only one tumen were also deployed. Regardless, tumen would often be understrength and the number of tumen deployed doesn't provide an accurate number of combatants.

The commander of a tumen was a tümen-ü noyan, a term sometimes translated "myriarch" (cf. myriad), meaning commander of 10,000.

In modern armies 
Tümen is a military unit which is still used in the Turkish Army, consisting of 6,000 to 10,000 soldiers. Its commander is a tümgeneral in the Army and Air Forces and a tümadmiral in the Naval Forces. It is the equivalent of a modern division.

See also

 Touman, the name of an emperor of the Xiongnu peoples of Central Asia
 Mongol military tactics and organization
 Tyumen—the name originates from tumen
 Tumen River
 Iranian toman
 Mingghan
 Myriad = 10,000

References

Genghis Khan
Military history of the Mongol Empire
Military units and formations by size
Mongolian words and phrases
Turkish words and phrases
10000 (number)

tr:Tümen